Tatyana Anisimova (born 19 October 1949) is a retired hurdler who represented the USSR. Anisimova was born in Grozny and trained at Burevestnik in Leningrad. She won a silver medal at the 1978 European Athletics Championships and at the 1976 Montreal Olympics.

She was a minor medallist at the Universiade in 1975 and 1977. She twice won a 60 metres hurdles bronze medal at the European Athletics Indoor Championships, doing so in 1975 and 1981.

International competitions

References

1949 births
Living people
Sportspeople from Grozny
Soviet female hurdlers
Russian female hurdlers
Olympic athletes of the Soviet Union
Olympic silver medalists for the Soviet Union
Olympic silver medalists in athletics (track and field)
Athletes (track and field) at the 1976 Summer Olympics
Athletes (track and field) at the 1980 Summer Olympics
Medalists at the 1976 Summer Olympics
Universiade medalists in athletics (track and field)
European Athletics Championships medalists
Burevestnik (sports society) athletes
Universiade silver medalists for the Soviet Union
Universiade bronze medalists for the Soviet Union
Medalists at the 1975 Summer Universiade
Medalists at the 1977 Summer Universiade